"Hush Little Baby" is a song by English rapper Wretch 32 which appears on his debut studio album, Black and White. The song is track thirteen on the standard edition of the album, and one of eleven collaborations; it is currently set to be released as the fifth and final single from the album on 27 May 2012. The song, which features singer-songwriter Ed Sheeran, was produced by the team TMS and co-written alongside Iain James.

The track debuted at number 87 on the UK Singles Chart and number twelve on the independent chart on 3 September 2011 following strong downloading from the respective album. The song is an adaptation of the American lullaby, Hush, Little Baby. In reviewing the album, BBC Music representative Joseph 'JP' Patterson stated "unlike many other albums where the central MC is joined by several contributors, the collaborations, including Sheeran, Chipmunk and Etta Bond, don't take away any shine from the artist at the core of this release".

Chart performance
Following the release of the album Black and White, the track "Hush Little Baby" debuted at number eighty-seven on the UK Singles Chart following strong downloading. The track also debuted at number twelve on the UK Indie Chart. Following its selection as the fifth single to be taken from Black and White, "Hush Little Baby" re-entered the chart at number ninety-five for the week ending 19 May 2012.

Track listing

Credits and personnel
Adapted from the album liner notes.
Songwriting – Jermaine Scott, Ed Sheeran, Iain James, Tom Barnes, Pete Kelleher, Ben Kohn
Production – TMS
Drums, programming – Tom Barnes
Guitar – Ben Kohn
Keyboards, bass – Pete Kelleher
Mixed – James F. Reynolds
Assistant mixer – Joachim Walker
Additional vocals – Ed Sheeran

Charts

Release history

References

2011 songs
2012 singles
Wretch 32 songs
Ed Sheeran songs
Songs written by Ed Sheeran
Songs written by Iain James
Song recordings produced by TMS (production team)
Songs written by Peter Kelleher (songwriter)
Songs written by Tom Barnes (songwriter)
Songs written by Ben Kohn
Ministry of Sound singles
Songs written by Wretch 32